Manuel II, (? – 3 November 1254) was the Patriarch of Constantinople from 1244 to 1255.

13th-century patriarchs of Constantinople
People of the Empire of Nicaea
1254 deaths